The 16th arrondissement of Marseille is one of the 16 arrondissements of Marseille. It is governed locally together with the 15th arrondissement, with which it forms the 8th sector of Marseille.

Population

Notable locations
 
 
Notre-Dame de la Galline, 4th century historic Roman Catholic chapel

References

External links
 Dossier complet, INSEE

 
Arrondissements of Marseille